Chip Off the Old Block is 1944 American comedy musical film starring Donald O'Connor, Peggy Ryan, and Ann Blyth. It was Blyth's film debut.

The son of a strict Navy man, O'Connor falls in love with a girl from a performing family (Ann Blyth). In the end, the families learn to accept their differences and they are allowed to be in love freely.

Cast 

 Donald O'Connor as Donald Corrigan
 Peggy Ryan as Peggy Flaherty
 Ann Blyth as Glory Marlow III
 Helen Vinson as Glory Marlow Jr.
 Helen Broderick as Glory Marlow Sr.
 Arthur Treacher as Quentin
 Patric Knowles as Commander Judd Corrigan
 J. Edward Bromberg as Blaney Wright
 Ernest Truex as Henry McHugh
 Minna Gombell as Milly
 Samuel S. Hinds as Dean Manning
 Irving Bacon as Prof. Frost
 Joel Kupperman as Quiz Kid
 Mantan Moreland as Porter
 unbilled players include Leon Belasco, Vernon Dent and Dorothy Granger

See also
List of American films of 1944

References

External links 

 

1944 films
Films directed by Charles Lamont
American black-and-white films
Universal Pictures films
1944 romantic comedy films
American romantic comedy films
1940s American films